Ingrid Gärde Widemar (1912–2009) was a Swedish lawyer and politician (Liberal People's Party (Sweden)). She was the first female Supreme Court Justice in Sweden.

Biography
Gärde was born on 24 March 1912. Her father was Natanael Gärde, a judge and a politician. She was a lawyer with her own practice since 1945. She was MP for Stockholm in the Lower Chamber 1949–52, Upper Chamber 1954–60, and Lower Chamber 1961–68. She was the first Supreme Court Justice of her gender in Sweden 1968–1977.

She got married Sven Widemar, a lawyer, in 1938, and they had four children together. She died on 2 January 2009.

Notes

Sources
Tvåkammarriksdagen 1867–1970, band 1 (Almqvist & Wiksell International 1988)

Further reading 
 

20th-century women lawyers
21st-century women lawyers
20th-century women judges
21st-century Swedish women politicians
20th-century Swedish women politicians
1912 births
2009 deaths
Members of the Riksdag from the Liberals (Sweden)
Women members of the Riksdag
Justices of the Supreme Administrative Court of Sweden
Politicians from Stockholm
Place of birth missing